Sheikh Russel (October 18, 1964 – August 15, 1975) was the youngest child of Sheikh Mujibur Rahman, the founding father and first President of Bangladesh. Russel and most of his direct family were killed in their home during the 1975 military coup.

Early life 
Russel was born on October 18, 1964, at Bangabandhu Bhaban in Dhanmondi, Dhaka, Bangladesh. He was the brother of Sheikh Hasina, the current Prime Minister of Bangladesh. At the time of his death, he was a student at the University Laboratory School.

Death 

On the morning of August 15, 1975, a group of young army officers surrounded Sheikh Mujibur Rahman's residence No. 32 in Dhanmondi with a tank. Later they killed Sheikh Mujib, with his family and his staff. The attackers then intercepted Russel and the personal secretary while fleeing. Terrified, the young Russel said in a tearful voice, "I'll go to my mother." Later, after seeing his mother's lifeless body, he beseeched in sorrow, "Send me to 'Hasu apa' (Sheikh Hasina)." According to the personal secretary, AFM Mahitul Islam,"Russel came running and grabbed me. He told me, "Bhaiya (brother), are they going to kill me?" Tears welled up in my eyes when I heard his voice. An assassin came and hit me painfully with the butt of a rifle. Seeing me beaten, Russel let go of me. He (Sheikh Russel) was crying, saying, "I will go to my mother; I will go to my mother." An assassin came and said to him, "Let's go to your mother." I couldn't believe that the killers would kill such a young child. Russel was taken inside and then the brush fire."

Legacy 
Several athletic organizations in Bangladesh have been named in memory of Russel, including the professional football club Sheikh Russel Krira Chakra, the Sheikh Russel School Table Tennis Tournament, the Sheikh Russel Memorial Sporting Club, and the Sheikh Russel Roller Skating Complex. In April 2014, a children's park named- "Sheikh Russel Shishutosh Angan" established in Kalabagan, Dhaka.

His birthday is observed annually by Bangladesh Awami League and organizations associated with it. The Sheikh Russel Jatio Shishu Kishore Parishad is a philanthropic organization based in Dhaka.

On February 20, 2016, Prime Minister Hasina opened the Shaheed Sheikh Russel Bridge on the Shibbaria River. On October 2, 2016, the Information and Communication Technology Division, Ministry of Posts, Telecom. and Information Technology, announced plans to build 2,000 computer labs named Sheikh Russel Digital Labs (SRDLs) in schools and colleges across Bangladesh.

References

1964 births
1975 deaths
People from Dhaka
Assassination of Sheikh Mujibur Rahman
Deaths by firearm in Bangladesh
Sheikh Mujibur Rahman family
Children of national leaders
Burials at Banani Graveyard
Bangladeshi people of Arab descent